Maureen Toal (7 September 1930 – 24 August 2012) was an Irish stage and television actress whose professional career lasted for more than sixty years.

She was born in 1930 and was originally from Fairview, Dublin. Toal began performing at the Abbey Theatre in Dublin in 1946, when she was just sixteen years old. She became a fixture at the theatre, portraying Bessie Burgess in The Plough and the Stars and  the Widow Quinn in The Playboy of the Western World. She also appeared in several one woman shows, including Baglady, which was written by Irish playwright Frank McGuinness.

Another playwright, John B. Keane, wrote the role of Mame Fadden in his play, The Change in Mame Fadden, specifically for Toal. Hugh Leonard also penned characters in his plays A life and Great Big Blonde with the intention of casting Toal in the parts. Toal was best known to Irish television audiences for her role as Teasy McDaid on RTÉ One's Glenroe during the 1990s.

Honours
The University College Dublin awarded Toal an honorary doctorate in literature in 2010.

Personal life
In 1952, she married fellow Irish actor Milo O'Shea; they divorced in 1974

Death
Maureen Toal died in her sleep at her home in Sandycove, Dublin, on 24 August 2012, two weeks before her 82nd birthday. She was survived by her sons, Steven and Colm O'Shea; two sisters, one brother, and three grandchildren.

Filmography

Partial playography 

 Bláithín agus an Mac Rí (1953)
 A Slipper for the Moon (1954)
 A Flea in Her Ear (1979)
 A Life (1979)
 Baglady (1985)
 Yerma (1987)

References

External links

1930 births
2012 deaths
Irish stage actresses
Irish television actresses
Actresses from Dublin (city)
People from Fairview, Dublin